Dalgopol Municipality is a municipality (obshtina) in Varna Province, Northeastern Bulgaria. It is named after its administrative centre - the town of Dalgopol.

The area contains the Tsonevo Reservoir - the third biggest in the country, developed along the Luda Kamchiya river which is the main tributary of Kamchiya river that crosses the municipality from west to east.

Settlements 

Dalgopol Municipality includes the following 16 places (towns are shown in bold):

Demography 
The following table shows the change of the population during the last four decades.

Religion 
According to the latest Bulgarian census of 2011, the religious composition, among those who answered the optional question on religious identification, was the following:

The municipality of Dalgopol has a mixed religious composition. At the 2011 census, 49.5% of respondents identified as Muslims and 41.7% as Orthodox Christians belonging to the Bulgarian Orthodox Church.

See also
Provinces of Bulgaria
Municipalities of Bulgaria
List of cities and towns in Bulgaria

References

External links
 Official website 

Municipalities in Varna Province